The Toyota MZ engine family is a piston V6 engine series. The MZ series has an aluminium engine block and aluminium alloy DOHC cylinder heads. The cylinders are lined with cast iron, and is of a closed deck design (no open space between the bores). The engine is a 60 degree V6 design. It uses multi-port fuel injection (MFI), four valves per cylinder, a one-piece cast camshaft and a cast aluminium intake manifold. The MZ family is a lightweight V6 engine of an all-aluminium design, using lighter weight parts than the heavier duty VZ block engines in an effort to lower production costs, decrease engine weight, and decrease reciprocating weight without sacrificing reliability. Toyota sought to enhance the drivability pattern of the engine (over the 3VZ) at exactly 3000 rpm, since that was the typical engine speed for motors cruising on the highway. The result was less cylinder distortion coupled with the decreased weight of rotating assemblies, smoother operation at that engine speed, and increased engine efficiency.

This engine has been phased out in most markets, replaced by variants of the new GR series.

1MZ-FE

The 1MZ-FE is a  dual overhead cam (DOHC) V6 engine. Horsepower ratings dropped after the Society of Automotive Engineers implemented a new power measurement system for vehicle engines, Toyota engines rated on 87 octane dropped the most, compared to the same engines used by Lexus rated on 91 octane. It has bucket tappets and was designed for good fuel economy of  city and  highway without an overall performance trade-off. These engines are prone to oil gelling. Another name for the issue was "engine sludge". There was a class action lawsuit due to this problem. It is very important to the life of these engines that oil changes are done on a regular basis.

The 1MZ-FE was on Ward's 10 Best Engines list for 1996.

Applications:
 1993–2002 Toyota Camry (V6)
 1993–2003 Lexus ES 300 & Toyota Windom (Japanese domestic market)
 1994–2004 Toyota Avalon & 2000 Toyota Pronard (Avalon for Japanese domestic market)
 1997-2003 Toyota Harrier (non-US markets)
 1997–2002 Toyota Sienna
 1997–2001 Toyota Mark II Wagon (Japanese domestic market)
 1998–2003 Toyota Solara (V6)
 2000–2005 Toyota Estima/Toyota Tarago/Toyota Previa

Toyota Racing Development offered a bolt-on TRD supercharger kit for the MY1997–2000 Camry, MY1998–2000 Sienna and MY1999–2000 Solara.

The 1MZ-FE with VVT-i is used in the Avalon, Highlander, Sienna and Camry. Early versions of the VVT-i 1MZ used a dual throttle body, cast aluminum intake manifold, and EGR block off plates on the exhaust manifolds. Later versions used a drive-by-wire/electronic throttle control.

Applications:
 1998–2003 Lexus RX 300 (US market)
 1999–2003 Lexus ES 300
 2000–2004 Toyota Avalon
 2000–2003 Toyota Highlander/Kluger
 2001–2003 Toyota Sienna
 2002–2008 Toyota Alphard (Japanese domestic market)
 2003–2006 Toyota Camry (V6)

2MZ-FE

The 2MZ-FE is a  engine replacing the 4VZ-FE as the worldwide 2.5 L V6.

Applications:
 1996-2001 Toyota Camry (Japanese, NZ and some other Non-US markets)
 1996-2001 Toyota Windom (Japanese domestic market)
 1997–2001 Toyota Mark II Qualis (Japanese domestic market)

3MZ-FE

The 3MZ-FE is a  version. It also features VVT-i, ETCS-i (Electronic Throttle Control System — intelligent/DBW), PA6 plastic intake, and increased throttle body diameter over the 1MZ. The 3MZ uses a new flat-type knock sensor, which is a departure from the typical resonator type knock sensor used on the previous MZs. Previous MZs had poor knock control, or perhaps oversensitivity when detecting knock, and power loss up to  may be realized due to erratic ignition timing when using an octane lower than 91. The new flat-type knock sensor is a completely different design and detects more frequencies than the traditional resonator type. This provides the ECU with more accurate data. A bolt goes through the center of the knock sensor, which then mates the sensor to the block on each bank.

Applications:
 2004-2007 Toyota Highlander
 2004–2008 Toyota Camry Solara (V6)
 2004–2006 Toyota Sienna
 2004–2006 Toyota Camry (XV30) (SE V6)
 2005–2010 Toyota Highlander Hybrid (reduced power output)
 2004–2006 Lexus RX 330
 2006–2008 Lexus RX 400h (reduced power output)
 2004–2006 Lexus ES 330
 2006-2014 Mitsuoka Orochi

See also

 List of Toyota engines
 List of Toyota transmissions

References

MZ
V6 engines
Gasoline engines by model